= Olofe =

The Olofe (Somali: Caloofi) (Arabic: علوفي) are a Somali clan group was mentioned in historical Italian sources as Galgial Olofe. also mentioned that they were involved in an incident in which the Italian administration of Somaliland in Nagehi was attacked during the 1920s. Other historical publications mention Olofe in connection with the Somali cabila system.
